The Elasmosaurus EP is a limited print EP by Matt Costa. It was released in 2005 on Venerable Media. The EP comprises six songs that were recorded during the sessions for his debut album Songs We Sing, but which were ultimately left off that album.

The cover image is of a sculpture of Elasmosaurus at Prehistoric Gardens in Oregon.

Track listing
 "Ballad of Miss Kate" - 4:32
 "These Arms" - 4:05
 "I Tried" - 2:44
 "Suicide Is Painless" - 2:40
 "Sweet Thursday" - 4:32
 "Lullaby" - 2:38

References

2005 EPs
Matt Costa albums